The 1944–45 Iowa Hawkeyes men's basketball team represented the University of Iowa in intercollegiate basketball during the 1944–45 season. The team finished the season with a 17–1 record and was retroactively named the national champion by the Premo-Porretta Power Poll.

Awards and honors
Dick Ives – Consensus Second-Team All-American
Herb Wilkinson – Consensus Second-Team All-American

References

Iowa Hawkeyes men's basketball seasons
Iowa
NCAA Division I men's basketball tournament championship seasons
Iowa Hawkeyes Men's Basketball Team
Iowa Hawkeyes Men's Basketball Team